Somerset County Cricket Club was formed in 1875, and first appeared in the County Championship in 1891.  They played their first List A match in the 1963 Gillette Cup against Glamorgan.  The players in this list have all played at least one List A match for Somerset. Somerset cricketers who have not represented the county in List A cricket are excluded from the list.

Players are listed in order of appearance, where players made their debut in the same match, they are ordered by batting order.

Key

List of players

See also
 Somerset County Cricket Club
 List of Somerset CCC players
 List of Somerset CCC players with 100 or more first-class or List A appearances
 List of Somerset CCC Twenty20 players

References

External links 
 List A matches played by Somerset at CricketArchive

List A